Kulesza is a surname of Polish origin.

Notable people with the surname include:

 Agata Kulesza (born 1971), Polish actress
 Beata Sokołowska-Kulesza (born 1974), Polish canoeist
Cezary Kulesza, Polish footballer
 Jakub Kulesza (born 1990), Polish politician
 Jolanta Sikorska-Kulesza (born 1957), Polish historian
 Kasia Kulesza (born 1976), Canadian swimmer
 Marek Kulesza (born 1959), Polish cyclist
 Marian Kulesza (1878–1943), Polish-Lithuanian painter
 Marta Pihan-Kulesza (born 1987), Polish gymnast
 Michał Kulesza (1799/1800–1863), Polish-Lithuanian painter and lithographer
 Roman Kulesza (born 1983), Polish artistic gymnast
 Ryszard Kulesza (1931–2008), Polish soccer player
 Seweryn Kulesza (1900–1983), Polish jockey
 Tomasz Kulesza (born 1959), Polish politician

See also
 
Kulesh
Kulish

Polish-language surnames